Exchange Hotel may refer to:

 in Australia
Exchange Hotel (Balmain), in Sydney, New South Wales
Exchange Hotel, Kalgoorlie in Kalgoorlie, Western Australia
Exchange Hotel, Laidley, a heritage-listed hotel in Queensland
Exchange Hotel, Mossman, a heritage-listed hotel in Queensland

in the United States 
Exchange Hotel (Milton, Florida), listed on the National Register of Historic Places in Santa Rosa County, Florida
Exchange Hotel (Cardington, Ohio), listed on the National Register of Historic Places in Morrow County, Ohio
 Exchange Hotel (Sandusky, Ohio), listed on the National Register of Historic Places in Sandusky, Ohio
Exchange Hotel (Gordonsville, Virginia), listed on the National Register of Historic Places in Orange County, Virginia
 Exchange Hotel (Richmond, Virginia)
 Exchange Hotel, Montgomery in Alabama